Coroebus may refer to:
 Coroebus of Phrygia, who came to aid Troy in the Trojan War 
 Coroebus (Argos), slayer of Poene, the personification of punishment sent upon Argos by Apollo
 Coroebus of Elis, a champion of the Olympiade
 Coroebus, an Irish-bred racehorse
 Coroebus of Thebes, a defender against the Seven Against Thebes, killed by Parthenopaeus.